"Til Nothing Comes Between Us" is a song written by Kerry Harvick, Tony Marty and Rebecca Marshall, and recorded by American country music artist John Michael Montgomery.  It was released in July 2002 as the first single from the album Pictures.  The song reached #19 on the Billboard Hot Country Singles & Tracks chart.

Chart performance

References

2002 singles
2002 songs
John Michael Montgomery songs
Song recordings produced by Scott Hendricks
Warner Records Nashville singles